Roberts Plūme (16 May 1897 – 25 August 1956) was a Latvian cyclist and cross-country skier. He competed as a cyclist at the 1924 and 1928 Summer Olympics and as a skier at the 1924 Winter Olympics.

References

External links
 

1897 births
1956 deaths
Latvian male cyclists
Latvian male cross-country skiers
Olympic cyclists of Latvia
Olympic cross-country skiers of Latvia
Cross-country skiers at the 1924 Winter Olympics
Cyclists at the 1924 Summer Olympics
Cyclists at the 1928 Summer Olympics
People from Jaunjelgava